Mehmandar (also Romanized as Mehmāndār) is a village in Dizajrud-e Sharqi Rural District, Qaleh Chay District, Ajab Shir County, East Azerbaijan Province, Iran. According to the 2006 census, its population in 2006 was 1,090, in 268 families.

References 

Populated places in Ajab Shir County